ASMI may refer to:
ASM International, a world leading Dutch company in the semiconductor industry
ASM International (society), American Society for Metals
American Sports Medicine Institute
Association for the Study of Modern Italy
Advanced System Management Interface, found in some IBM POWER microprocessors based IBM servers
Asmi Shrestha (born 1993), Nepalese model
ASMI, 9mm Machine Pistol developed by India.